HelloGiggles.com is an entertainment and lifestyle website launched in May 2011. It was founded by actress/musician Zooey Deschanel, producer Sophia Rivka Rossi and writer Molly McAleer. The website is geared toward women, and covers topics in popular culture, love, friendship, careers, style, food, and daily news. HelloGiggles.com is marketed as a "positive online community" by its users with a strict "no gossip" policy. Reader contributions are permitted, and many are published every day.

Reception
Forbes' website called the site "one of the best examples of how the online landscape for women is changing due to fast and effectively strong word of mouth" and that it "offers engaging content for the young professional woman" while showing that the "voice of the modern young woman comes in a variety of flavors". Mashable said the site "warm[s] [the internet] up with fun and empowering, lady-friendly content".

Current era (2015–present)
HelloGiggles was acquired by Time Inc. in 2015. The terms of the deal were not disclosed to the public, but online reports pegged the acquisition price by Time as being around $30 million. The print edition of the online magazine debuted in 2018.

References

External links
hellogiggles.com

American women's websites
Lifestyle websites
Internet properties established in 2011
2011 establishments in the United States
Meredith Corporation
IAC (company)
2015 mergers and acquisitions